Álvaro Martínez may refer to:

Álvaro Martínez (footballer, born 1974), Spanish retired football goalkeeper
Álvaro Martínez (footballer, born 1979), Spanish retired football defender